Busta Rhymes Island is a proposed name for an otherwise unnamed island in Shrewsbury, Worcester County, Massachusetts. The name refers to the rapper Busta Rhymes. The island is located in Mill Pond in Shrewsbury and measures . The island was named in 2005 by Shrewsbury resident Kevin O'Brien who began frequenting and caring for the upkeep of the island.

Naming 
O'Brien has attempted to register the name with the United States Board on Geographic Names, however the name was refused as the rules require the person commemorated to have been dead for at least 5 years. O'Brien has since attempted to have the name adopted officially through a rule related to local usage of a name and local geographic activists have named the Island on Google Maps. A petition has been created for the US Board on Geographic Names to formally recognise the name.

In popular culture 
The island and the campaign to officially name it Busta Rhymes Island was the central topic of an episode of 99% Invisible which explored the naming of places. The island is also included in the book "The 99% Invisible City" as an example of informal geonyms.

See also 
 List of islands named after people

References

External links 
 99% Invisible episode 105: One Man is an Island
 Busta Rhymes Island on Google Maps
 Busta Rhymes Island on OpenStreetMap

Islands of Massachusetts
Geographical naming disputes
Lake islands of Massachusetts